This Is Where We Came In is a 1990 children's play by British playwright Alan Ayckbourn. It is about three storytellers, Great Aunt Repetitus, Uncle Erraticus, Uncle Oblivious, who trap six players in twisted re-interpretations of fairy tales. It was originally presented as a two-parter shown on Saturday mornings, where the plays could be seen out of order, but the two parts were put together and made into a single event in Christmas 1991.

This Is Where We Came In is a chronicle of a group of misfits who have fallen victim to their story-teller overlord's fierce control.

References
 This Is Where We Came In on official Ayckbourn site
 Allen, Paul (2004) A Pocket Guide to Alan Ayckbourn Plays Faber & Faber 

Plays by Alan Ayckbourn
1990 plays